Pingitore is a surname. Notable people with the surname include:

Mike Pingitore (1888–1952), American jazz musician
Pier Francesco Pingitore (born 1934), Italian director, screenwriter, playwright, and author

Italian-language surnames